Gnaphon is a genus of beetles in the family Carabidae, containing the following species:

 Gnaphon costatus Andrewes, 1929
 Gnaphon humeralis (Putzeys, 1879)
 Gnaphon loyolae (Fairmaire, 1883)

References

Scaritinae